Megacyllene trifasciata is a species of beetle in the family Cerambycidae. It was described by Viana in 1994.

References

Megacyllene
Beetles described in 1994